Claudia Vanessa Dobles Camargo (born 19 November 1980) is a Costa Rican architect and urban planner. Dobles, the wife of President Carlos Alvarado Quesada, served as the First Lady of Costa Rica from 2018 to 2022. She is the first person from San Carlos to hold the position of first lady.

Early life
Dobles was born on 19 November 1980, in Ciudad Quesada to Carlos Dobles and María Claudia Camargo. Her father is Costa Rican, while her mother had moved to the country from Mexico. She attended kindergarten in Mexico, but completed her elementary and high school studies in San José, Costa Rica. She met her future husband, Carlos Alvarado Quesada, on the bus that both took to school.

Prominent roles
Dobles played a prominent role in her husband's 2018 presidential campaign. In addition to her role as the candidate's wife, Dobles was seen as a key advisor to both Alvarado and the campaign staff.

Dobles is also advising the Costa Rican government's environmental economic plan to completely replace the nation's use of fossil fuels with renewable energy sources.

References

Living people
1980 births
First ladies and gentlemen of Costa Rica
Costa Rican architects
Citizens' Action Party (Costa Rica) politicians
University of Costa Rica alumni
Costa Rican people of Mexican descent
People from San Carlos (canton)
Costa Rican Roman Catholics